Coburgosuchus is an extinct genus of mystriosuchin phytosaur. The genus was named for Coburg, Germany, the type locality where specimens have been found dating back to the Late Triassic. It has at times been considered a nomen dubium due to the fragmentary nature of the material associated with the genus, and it may prove to be synonymous with other phytosaurs such as Nicrosaurus  or Phytosaurus.

References

Phytosaurs
Prehistoric reptile genera
Late Triassic reptiles of Europe
Triassic Germany
Fossils of Germany
Fossil taxa described in 1954